The India cricket team toured Ireland in June 2022 to play two Twenty20 International (T20I) matches. On 1 March 2022, Cricket Ireland announced the schedule. On 15 June 2022, Ireland named their squad for the two-match series. Later the same day, India also confirmed their squad for the matches, with Hardik Pandya named as their captain.

The first T20I was delayed by more than two hours due to rain, before the match was reduced to twelve overs per side. Each side fielded a debutant, with Conor Olphert making his international debut for Ireland, and Umran Malik playing his first match for India. Batting first, Ireland made 108/4 from their twelve overs, with Harry Tector making an unbeaten 64 runs. In reply, India chased down the target in 9.2 overs, to win the match by seven wickets.

In the second T20I, India scored 225/7, with Deepak Hooda scoring his first century in a T20I match. In reply, Ireland fell just four runs short of the target, as they made 221/5, with India winning the match and taking the series 2–0. Deepak Hooda was named the player of the series for his century and his 47 not out in the first match. After the match, Ireland's captain Andrew Balbirnie said that "it's not every day you get that close against a team like India", but was "bitterly disappointed" in losing the match by such a narrow margin.

Squads

T20I series

1st T20I

2nd T20I

References

External links
 Series home at ESPN Cricinfo

2022 in Irish cricket
2022 in Indian cricket
International cricket competitions in 2022
Indian cricket tours of Ireland